Ashfield is a surname. Notable people with the surname include:

Edmund Ashfield (Catholic agent) (died c.1620), English Catholic agent
Edmund Ashfield, 17th-century English painter
George Ashfield (1934–1985), English former footballer
Kate Ashfield (born 1972), British actress
Keith Ashfield (1952–2018), Canadian politician
Kim Ashfield (born 1959), Welsh model
Lionel Ashfield (1898–1918), British WWI flying ace
Robert Ashfield (1911–2006), English musician and composer
Stephen Ashfield, Scottish actor

English-language surnames